

Wilhelm Behrens (23 August 1888  – 15 August 1968) was a German general in the Wehrmacht during World War II who commanded several divisions. He was a recipient of the Knight's Cross of the Iron Cross of Nazi Germany. Behrens was discharged from active service in 1944; in 1946 he was arrested by Soviet authorities and interned until 1949.

Awards and decorations

 German Cross in Gold on 9 December 1941 as Oberst in Infanterie-Regiment 106
 Knight's Cross of the Iron Cross on 17 March 1942 as Oberst and commander of Infanterie-Regiment 106

References

Citations

Bibliography

 
 

1888 births
1968 deaths
Military personnel from Berlin
German Army personnel of World War I
Lieutenant generals of the German Army (Wehrmacht)
Recipients of the Gold German Cross
Recipients of the Knight's Cross of the Iron Cross
German prisoners of war in World War II held by the Soviet Union
Prussian Army personnel
People from the Province of Brandenburg
Recipients of the clasp to the Iron Cross, 1st class
20th-century Freikorps personnel